The Last Resort is a BBC Books original novel written by Paul Leonard and based on the long-running British science fiction television series Doctor Who. It features the Eighth Doctor, Fitz, Anji and Trix.

Plot
This story begins with Fitz and Anji working for the Good Times Inc. Company. They are working undercover for the Doctor, who is shocked to discover a company that is selling holidays in time.

The climax of the story results in the destruction of billions of universes. The Doctor and Sabbath realise all time travellers must be stopped, to prevent these events from happening again. However, at the end of the book a man reveals he has a time-travel machine and proceeds to begin interfering in time once again.........

External links
The Cloister Library - The Last Resort

2003 British novels
2003 science fiction novels
Eighth Doctor Adventures